Meyrick Booth B.Sc., Ph.D., (1883–1968) was a British educational psychologist.

Works
 Charles Dickens und seine Werke in Pädagogischer Beleuchtung, Schulthess & Co., 1909.
 Rudolf Eucken: his Philosophy and Influence, T. Fisher Unwin, 1913.
 Social Reconstruction in Germany, G. Allen & Unwin Limited, 1919.
 Women and Society, Allen and Unwin, 1929.
 Youth and Sex, G. Allen & Unwin ltd., 1932 [Am. ed., New York, W. Morrow & Company, 1933].
Notably mentions an early attempt to form a men's rights league.

Articles
 "The Decay of Fixed Ideals," The Dublin Review, Vol. CXLVIII, January/April, 1911.
 "Religious Belief as Affecting the Growth of Population," The Hibbert Journal, Vol. XIII, October 1914/July 1915.
 "A Voice of Warning." In Anarchy or Order, Duty & Discipline Movement, 1915.
 "Idealistic Revolt in Germany," The Living Age, March 8, 1924.
 "The Sex Ratio," The Living Age, September 1928.

Miscellany
 F. W. Foerster, Marriage and the Sex-problem, Translated by Meyrick Booth, Stokes, 1912 [1st Pub. Wells Gardner, Darton & Co., ltd., c. 1911].
 Rudolf Christoph Eucken, Main Currents of Modern Thought: A Study of the Spiritual and Intellectual Movements of the Present Day, Translated by Meyrick Booth, T. Fisher Unwin, 1912.
 Rudolf Christoph Eucken, Collected Essays of Rudolf Eucken, Edited and Translated by Meyrick Booth, T. Fisher Unwin, 1914.
 Rev. Paul Simon, The Human Element in the Church of Christ, Translated by Meyrick Booth, Newman Press, 1954.
 Frederick Von Gagern, The Problem of Onanism, Translated by Meyrick Booth, Mercier Press, 1956.
 Bernhard Häring, The Sociology of the Family, Translated by Meyrick Booth, Mercier Press, 1959.

See also
 Birth control
 Rudolf Christoph Eucken

Notes

External links
 Portrait of Dr. Meyrick Booth, by Wyndham Lewis, at the National Portrait Gallery, in London

1883 births
English psychologists
Social psychologists
Year of death missing
Date of death unknown